Central Coast Football is a governing body and football (soccer) competition located in the Central Coast region of New South Wales. Its administrative headquarters are based at Pluim Park, Lisarow, New South Wales. The association consists of a Premier League, a Division 1 and ten all ages competitions which correspond to tiers six to seventeen on the Australian soccer pyramid. Clubs are based all across the Central Coast.

History
The Central Coast Soccer Association was formed in 1963 with the first year of top-flight competition in 1965. It was later changed to Central Coast Football as the use of the word 'football' replaces 'soccer' in Australia.

In January 2022, CCF announced that the association was disaffiliating with Football Australia and Football NSW. This is due to CCF believing that the FA and FNSW do not value CCF and don't invest in grassroots football on the Central Coast. This has led to CCF being essentially banned from Football Australia and Football NSW competitions.

Teams and structure

Tiers
The Central Coast Premier League sits at the sixth tier of the Australian football league system, Division one sits at the seventh tier, while the ten all age divisions stretch from tiers 8 to 17.

Leagues
Central Coast Football is responsible for overseeing all men's, women's and junior's competitions as well as small sided competitions such as Soccer 5's.

Teams
There are a total of 24 clubs competing across all CCF tiers and divisions.

Defunct Teams

Competing Premier League Clubs in 2022

Honours

Performance in FFA Cup/Australia Cup

References

External links
 Central Coast Football Official Website

Soccer leagues in New South Wales
Soccer governing bodies in Australia
1963 establishments in Australia
Sports organizations established in 1963